Cudal is a town in the Central West region of New South Wales, Australia. The town was first surveyed in 1867. Running through the town is "Boree Creek". Platypi are common in the Boree Creek, giving Cudal the catchline 'home of the platypus' on signs entering the town. The place name, Cudal, could have derived from an Aboriginal word meaning 'flat'. Industry and commerce in Cudal is a mixture of retail, government services, and agriculture (sheep, canola).

History
Major Thomas Mitchell left on his exploration of inland Australia from the historic homestead Boree Cabonne near Cudal in 1835.

Two factors contributed to the establishment of the town of Cudal. One was the 1860s free selection laws of New South Wales, allowing people to move to newer areas of the colony. The second was the need to access the gold fields in Forbes, which required the crossing of Boree Creek. Cudal is situated on the banks of Boree Creek. As a mid way point between Orange and Canowindra and Eugowra, it was a place to rest, see to horses and stay safe from bushrangers. Cudal was first surveyed in 1867. In 1882 the town had two churches, a bank, a public school, five stores, three hotels and a mixture of other businesses.

Cudal is located on The Escort Way, an important road within NSW for the transport of gold from the diggings to the main commercial centres. Consequently, bushrangers, including Ben Hall and Frank Gardiner, operated in the area.

Many men from the district participated in war as part of the duty for King and country. The memorial park gates on Main Street honour their service and list those who made the supreme sacrifice.

Hazelton Airlines operated from Cudal airport, using the airport as both an administrative centre and maintenance facility, until it ceased to operate in the 1990s.

On 5 May 2015 a fire  destroyed the Royal Hotel on Main Street. It has since been fully demolished.

Cordern's Store

The Commercial Exchange Store, located on Main Street, was built in 1901. It replaced a previous Parkers building erected in 1875. The store was designed to offer for sale to the people of Cudal and district all the goods one would need from drapery to foods to tools. In 1921 the store was purchased by Mr. E. W. Cordern and the name changed to "Cordern's Store". The store operated until 1958. The building then was used by the local Boree Shire Council until 2001. At this point a group of local women took over the building and it has once again become the centre of Cudal retail, now known as the "Cabonne Food Wine and Cultural Centre".  The centre includes a cafe, crafts, antiques, and a library. There are also a number of displays on people and items from the town history. Volunteers from the local community operate the store Friday - Sunday.

Industry & Commerce 

Cudal has a mixture of retail stores including a cafe & general store, the above-mentioned Cabonne Food Wine & Cultural Centre, and an Australia Post Post Office. The Post Office acts as an agent for a number of banks including Commonwealth Bank, it also acts as a newsagency. An agency for the Credit Union is within the council office. The Bowling Club provides leisure activities and also has an onsite ATM. Shell has a 24-hour self-service filling point just off Main Street. A caravan park and motel provides accommodation for visitors. The town is suitable for RV users.

Cumulus Estate Wines 
Within the Cudal district is the winery of Cumulus Estate Wines. This is the bottling and cellar facility for wine marques including "Rolling" (served on Qantas), "Climbing", and "Six Hundred Above". The winery has a 10,000 tonne vintage capacity, fermentation and maturation capabilities. It also has 8 million litres of wine storage capacity, mostly in an underground barrel hall carved into the area's volcanic stone. The barrel hall is also the setting for tasting dinners.

Monument Vineyard 
The 250 acre Monument Vineyard is located within the Cudal district upon terra rosa soil. Within the vineyard itself there is also a cage free poultry farm housing approximately 240,000 laying hens.

Government & Civil Services 

Cabonne Shire has an office in Cudal as well as a works depot. The shire provides a swimming pool, playground / BBQ area, and community centre. Health services from the NSW Health are provided through rural nursing. The NSW Police Force has a station in the town. Cudal Public School is a K-6 school for children of the town and  district. NSW TrainLink has regular coach services through the town, connecting Cudal with Orange, Cootamundra (for Melbourne), Forbes, and Sydney.

Churches 

Cudal has three historic churches. The Catholic church of St. Columbanus, established in 1880. The Church of England St. James. The third is a Uniting Church which has been sold to a private buyer.

Notable Citizens
Merle Parrish

References

External links

About Cudal Cabonne Shire Council official website

Towns in New South Wales
Towns in the Central West (New South Wales)
Cabonne Council